The Reppies is a live-action American educational musical show for children created by Northstar Entertainment along with Treat Entertainment, which formed Reppies Entertainment Inc, L.L.C. The series centers around a group of anthropomorphic reptile creatures (in oversized costumes) that sing in a music group and interact with a Mary Poppins-like English tutor, who also sings and dances. In some of the episodes she seemingly displays magical powers.

The series was produced by WEDU Television in Tampa, Florida. Each episode featured three original songs produced by Rick Tell. Twenty six half hour episodes and one hour long holiday special were originally created in 1996, and aired on a few public television stations. All of the episodes were later re-dubbed with Christian-oriented messages and moved to Trinity Broadcasting Network and the Christian Television Network.

Originally created by Wendy Harrison from Sault Ste. Marie, Ontario, along with the father son team of Pat and Steve McGonigle of Northstar Entertainment. James "Smokey" Knudson was the series producer and Brian McBride as executive in charge of production for the entire series run. Bruce Foulke was the Music Supervisor for the series. It currently airs on Smile network.

The cast includes American actress Trudie Petersen as Miss Summerhayes the English tutor, Rick Stanley as Mickey the band's manager, and 13-year-old actress Tailia Osteen who plays Katie in Four Episodes.

Episodes

Series overview

Season 1 (1996-1998)

References

External links
The Reppies @ TBN
IMDB Listing

1996 American television series debuts
1998 American television series endings
1990s American children's television series
1990s American music television series
American children's education television series
American children's musical television series
American television shows featuring puppetry
English-language television shows
PBS Kids shows
PBS original programming
Television series about reptiles and amphibians